"Take Yourself Home" is a song by Australian singer-songwriter Troye Sivan. The song was released via EMI Music Australia on 1 April 2020 as the lead single from his fifth EP In a Dream (2020).

Charts

Release history

References

2020 singles
2020 songs
Songs written by Troye Sivan
Troye Sivan songs
Songs written by Leland (musician)
Songs written by Oscar Görres
Songs written by Tayla Parx